known professionally as  is a Japanese male enka singer and composer, who also sings folk and pop music. He has sold more than 90 million records, making him one of the best selling Japanese musicians.

Mori has been married and divorced twice, first to Reiko Ohara and then to Masako Mori. His sons, Takahiro Moriuchi and Hiroki Moriuchi are vocalist of the rock bands One Ok Rock and My First Story, respectively.

Career 
In the beginning, Mori won a competition at Fuji Television Network in 1965. He debuted with the successful song "Onna no Tameiki" of the famous composer Inomata Kōshō in 1966.

His debut at Kōhaku Uta Gassen was in 1968, singing "Hana To Chō". His 1974 Japan Record Award-winning song "Erimo Misaki" was composed by Takuro Yoshida. His 1982 song "Fuyu no Riviera" was composed by Eiichi Ohtaki, former member of Happy End. His song "Ofukuro san" was covered by Sharam Q in their 1997 album Sharam Q no Enka no Hanamichi. His 2003 song "Ōkami Tachi no Tōboe" was written and composed by Tsuyoshi Nagabuchi. His 2004 song "Saraba Seishun no Kageyo" was written by Izumi Sakai.

In 2007, his musical godfather Kōhan Kawauchi became his enemy, because Mori added other lyrics into the original lyrics of "Ofukuro San" at the 57th NHK Kōhaku Uta Gassen. Shinichi's long career as an enka singer is well-known and he has many appearances in Kōhaku Uta Gassen. He has taken part in the Kōhaku Uta Gassen since his debut at 19th Kōhaku Uta Gassen.

In October 2008, his single "Hatoba" debuted at number 27 on Japan's Oricon charts. The song was composed by himself. By the song "Hatoba", he became the first artist to have one hundred of Top 100 singles in Japan's Oricon charts history.

Discography 
  : 1966
  : 1968
  : 1969
  : 1969
  : 1970
  : 1971
  : 1973
  : 1974
  : 1975
  : 1976
  : 1977
  : 1979
  : 1980
  : 1982
  : 1984
  : 1986
  : 1987
  : 1989
  : 1990
  : 1991
  : 1993
  : 1994
  : 1996
  : 1998
  : 1999
  : 2000
  : 2001
  : 2002
  : 2002
  : 2003
  : 2004
  : 2005
  : 2006
  : 2007
  : 2008
  : 2008
  : 2009

Kohaku Uta Gassen

Honours 
Order of the Rising Sun, 4th Class, Gold Rays with Rosette (2021)

See also 
 List of best-selling music artists
 List of best-selling music artists in Japan

References

External links 
 Mori Communi 

Japanese male pop singers
Enka singers
1947 births
Living people
Victor Entertainment artists
People from Kōfu, Yamanashi
Musicians from Yamanashi Prefecture
Musicians from Yamaguchi Prefecture
Japanese racehorse owners and breeders
Recipients of the Order of the Rising Sun, 4th class